Sticta corymbosa is a species of foliose lichen in the family Peltigeraceae. Found in Puerto Rico, it was formally described as a new species in 2020 by Joel Mercado‐Díaz and Robert Lücking. It is only known to occur at the type locality, where it grows as an epiphyte in humid and open to partially shaded habitats. The specific epithet refers to the corymbose (clustered) isidia found along the margins of the lobes.

References

corymbosa
Lichen species
Lichens described in 2020
Lichens of the Caribbean
Taxa named by Robert Lücking